The German Democratic Republic (commonly known as East Germany) made its first and only Paralympic Games appearance at the 1984 Summer Paralympics in Stoke Mandeville and New York City, where it entered four competitors in athletics.

This marked East Germany's first and only appearance at the Paralympic Games, as it  never took part in the Winter Paralympics. Thus the country's tally at the 1984 Summer Games (three silver medals and one bronze) is also its all-round Paralympic Games tally.

Medalists

Athletics

See also
 East Germany at the Olympics
 Germany at the Paralympics

References

Nations at the 1984 Summer Paralympics
1984
Paralympics